Ghadir (named after the Ghadir Khumm) is a class of midget submarines built by Iran specifically for cruising within the shallow waters of the Persian Gulf. The Islamic Republic of Iran Navy is the sole operator of this class, whose all submarines serve in the Southern Fleet. No submarine of this class is active at the Northern Fleet, i.e. the Caspian Sea.

History
Iran had shown interest in midget submarines in the 1980s. According to the Conway's All The World's Fighting Ships, Iran assembled a midget in Bandar Abbas that was completed in 1987 in an unsuccessful attempt. Iran reportedly purchased a second midget of another design from North Korea, delivered in 1988.

Existence of Ghadir class was first known in February 2004. An unclassified 2017 report by the U.S. Office of Naval Intelligence stated that Iran purchased at least one  submarine from North Korea in that year.

In May 2005, Iran announced that it has started mass production of its own indigenous midget submarines, and aired footage of one cruising at sea level on television. Later that month, the submarine was tested during the third phase of military exercise Ettehad 84. In November 2007, commander of the IRIN Commodore Habibollah Sayyari said the second ship in the class has been completed after ten years of construction. Iranian supreme leader Ali Khamenei was quoted saying to Iran's navy commanders on the day the submarine was launched: "Today, you have been able to design and build many of the military requirements. We have become self-sufficient from other countries."

Design 
Sources are inconsistent about the class which Ghadir submarines are derived from.

Ghadir submarines displace  when at the surface and  while submerged.

They have a secondary retractable propeller and are powered by diesel–electric machinery, and fitted with two  torpedo tubes.

Submarines in the class are equipped with sonars of an unknown type.

Ghadir'''s crew totals 7 officers and men.

Operational capabilitiesGhadir submarines are alleged to have launched different types of torpedoes, namely Valfajr and Hoot. Anti-ship cruise missiles Nasr-1 and Jask-2 are both reportedly launched successfully, the latter being developed specifically for launch from submarines. The ships in the class are also capable of laying naval mines in addition to retrieving frogmen for special operations. They are assumed to have "an extremely limited endurance", while described as "very maneuverable", as well as being able to "sit silently submerged while waiting for its prey". Considering that Ghadir submarines could possess only two torpedoes or missiles, Joseph Trevithick writes that Iranians may plan to use them "en masse to launch barrages of the missiles".

Vijay Sakhuja, director of the National Maritime Foundation, comments that the class is "[the] most difficult to detect particularly when resting on the seabed and this could be the possible tactics that the Iranian Navy could employ during hostilities. Further, given their numbers, these could overwhelm enemy's technological superiority".

According to U.S. Navy Captain Tracy A. Vincent, Ghadir submarines can provide additional surveillance capability and create a new layer of defense for Iranian naval forces. Commander Daniel Dolan maintains that the submarines are well-designed for the purpose of guerrilla warfare, ambush and anti-access/area denial (A2/AD), describing them as potentially more expendable in comparison to  attack submarines. He argues that American fleet is prone to a high threat environment created by sheer number of these "small but lethal threats". Royal Navy Commander Ryan Ramsey, who captained nuclear submarine  in the Persian Gulf has stated that the submarines are a threat to western forces operating in the region, adding that "[t]he Ghadir-class are tiny submarines but have enough torpedoes to sink a couple of ships".

Mark Episkopos opines that Ghadir submarines maintain "strong offensive capabilities" that contribute to the "dangerous" subsurface fleet of Iran.

IRIN commander Hossein Khanzadi has said the class "can do what the U-boats did during World War II".

 Number built 
Iran does not disclose the number of its submarines. Sources differ in determining the number of Ghadir submarines built and operated, with estimates ranging between 10 and 21 units, as of 2019.

According to 2020 edition of the Military Balance published by the International Institute of Strategic Studies (IISS), Iran operates 14 submarines in this class. Farzin Nadimi of The Washington Institute estimated that about 20 are in service as of 2020.

On the report of Jane's Fighting Ships, one was lost in April 2014 during an exercise, while American military intelligence says she was reportedly sank on patrol, possibly due to collision with rocks.

Anthony Cordesman wrote in 2016 that Iran has up to 17 Ghadir submarines.

 Known commissionings This list may be incomplete''.

 May 2005: 1 (at least, more possible)
 28 November 2007: 1
 27 November 2008: 1
 1 June 2009: 3
 28 November 2009: 2
 8 August 2010: 4
 26 November 2011: 3
 10 February 2012: 2
 28 November 2012: 2
 28 November 2018: 1 (pennant number 955)
 5 September 2022: 1

Recommissionings after overhaul 
 28 November 2018: 1 (pennant number 942)
 8 April 2020: 1

See also

 List of submarine classes in service
 List of naval ship classes of Iran
 List of military equipment manufactured in Iran

References

External links

Yono Class / Ghadir Class Midget Submarine at GlobalSecurity.org
Ghadir (IS-120) at cmano-db.com

Submarine classes of the Islamic Republic of Iran Navy
Midget submarines
Ships built by Marine Industries Organization